Best of the Sugar Hill Years may refer to:

 Best of the Sugar Hill Years (Jerry Douglas album), 2007
 Best of the Sugar Hill Years (Reckless Kelly album), 2007